Trinity Hall Boat Club (THBC) is the rowing club of Trinity Hall, a college of the University of Cambridge.  Founded in 1827 it is amongst the oldest college boat clubs in Cambridge, England. Historically, it is the most successful Cambridge college at Henley Royal Regatta with a number of wins, including winning all the events but one in 1887.

The club has produced numerous rowers for the Oxford and Cambridge Boat Race and various national teams, including Tom James, who stroked the 8+ from Great Britain to the B-final in the 2004 Olympics in Athens and won gold with the 4- at the 2008 Olympics in Beijing.

The club colours are black and white, its nickname is "Black and White army", its motto "Our power's a crescent" (the college crest showing a crescent ermine. The motto used to be "Our powers are crescent" taking the old meaning for crescent meaning growing – i.e. a crescent moon is a waxing moon), and its supporters shout "Row Hall" to encourage the rowers. Unlike other boat clubs, whose scarves are derived from their college scarves, its scarf is made in a black and white tartan.

THBC has a senior rowers' (alumni) club called The Black and White Society.

History

The college first boats, both men and women have been Head of the Lent and May Bumps on numerous occasions in the history of the races, dominating the Mays in the 1890s and both events in the early 1990s.

From 1890 until 1898, Trinity Hall stayed Head of the Mays for 33 consecutive days, which remains to this day the longest continuous defence by a single club of the bumps headship since the Lent and May Bumps became separate events.

Trinity Hall were eventually deposed from the top spot in 1898 by First Trinity, who held the headship for 10 days, then Third Trinity who held the headship for a further 24 days, then again by First Trinity for 2 more days, meaning that boats from Trinity College held the headship for 36 consecutive days, but until the 1940s, Trinity maintained more than one boatclub.

Honours

Henley Royal Regatta

References

 CUCBC (various years) – Lent and May Bumps programmes.

External links

Trinity Hall Boat Club
CUCBC (Cambridge University Combined Boat Clubs)

Rowing clubs of the University of Cambridge
Boat club
1827 establishments in England
Sports clubs established in 1827
Rowing clubs in Cambridgeshire
Rowing clubs in England
Rowing clubs of the River Cam